The coral-billed ground cuckoo (Carpococcyx renauldi), also known as Renauld's ground cuckoo, is a large terrestrial species of cuckoo in the family Cuculidae. It is found in Cambodia, Laos, Thailand, and Vietnam. Its natural habitat is tropical moist lowland forests. Its English name refers to its coral-red bill, which separates it from the two other members of the genus Carpococcyx.

References

coral-billed ground cuckoo
Birds of Cambodia
Birds of Laos
Birds of Vietnam
coral-billed ground cuckoo
Taxonomy articles created by Polbot